Maglić may refer to:

 Maglić, Serbia, a village in Vojvodina
 Maglić (mountain), a mountain in Bosnia and Herzegovina and Montenegro
 Bogdan Maglić, Serbian American physicist

See also
 Maglič, a castle in Serbia